Michael G. McCaffery is chairman and managing director of Makena Capital Management. He was previously the president and CEO of the Stanford Management Company, which oversees the Stanford University Endowment.

McCaffery holds a BA from Princeton University, a BA and an MA as a Rhodes Scholar from Merton College, Oxford and an MBA from the Stanford Graduate School of Business.

He serves as a Trustee of the Rhodes Scholarship Trust.

References

Princeton School of Public and International Affairs alumni
Alumni of Merton College, Oxford
Stanford University alumni
American Rhodes Scholars
Living people
Year of birth missing (living people)